Giovanni Boccaccio (16 June 1313 – 21 December 1375) was an Italian writer, poet, correspondent of Petrarch, and an important Renaissance humanist. Born in the town of Certaldo, he became so well known as a writer that he was sometimes simply known as "the Certaldese" and one of the most important figures in the European literary panorama of the fourteenth century. Some scholars (including Vittore Branca) define him as the greatest European prose writer of his time, a versatile writer who amalgamated different literary trends and genres, making them converge in original works, thanks to a creative activity exercised under the banner of experimentalism.

His most notable works are The Decameron, a collection of short stories which in the following centuries was a determining element for the Italian literary tradition, especially after Pietro Bembo elevated the Boccaccian style to a model of Italian prose in the sixteenth century, and On Famous Women. He wrote his imaginative literature mostly in Tuscan vernacular, as well as other works in Latin, and is particularly noted for his realistic dialogue which differed from that of his contemporaries, medieval writers who usually followed formulaic models for character and plot. The influence of Boccaccio's works was not limited to the Italian cultural scene but extended to the rest of Europe, exerting influence on authors such as Geoffrey Chaucer, a key figure in English literature, or later on Miguel de Cervantes, Lope de Vega and the Spanish classical theater.

Boccaccio, together with Dante Alighieri and Francesco Petrarca, is part of the so-called "Three Crowns" of Italian literature. He is remembered for being one of the precursors of humanism, of which he helped lay the foundations in the city of Florence, in conjunction with the activity of his friend and teacher Petrarch. He was the one who initiated Dante's criticism and philology: Boccaccio devoted himself to copying codices of the Divine Comedy and was a promoter of Dante's work and figure.

In the twentieth century, Boccaccio was the subject of critical-philological studies by Vittore Branca and Giuseppe Billanovich, and his Decameron was transposed to the big screen by the director and writer Pier Paolo Pasolini.

Biography

Childhood and youth, 1313–1330 

The details of Boccaccio's birth are uncertain. He was born in Florence or in a village near Certaldo where his family was from. He was the son of Florentine merchant Boccaccino di Chellino and an unknown woman; he was likely born out of wedlock. Boccaccio's stepmother was called Margherita de' Mardoli.

Boccaccio grew up in Florence. His father worked for the Compagnia dei Bardi and, in the 1320s, married Margherita dei Mardoli, who was of a well-to-do family. Boccaccio may have been tutored by Giovanni Mazzuoli and received from him an early introduction to the works of Dante. In 1326, his father was appointed head of a bank and moved with his family to Naples. Boccaccio was an apprentice at the bank but disliked the banking profession. He persuaded his father to let him study law at the Studium (the present-day University of Naples), where he studied canon law for the next six years. He also pursued his interest in scientific and literary studies.

His father introduced him to the Neapolitan nobility and the French-influenced court of Robert the Wise (the king of Naples) in the 1330s. At this time, he fell in love with a married daughter of the king, who is portrayed as "Fiammetta" in many of Boccaccio's prose romances, including Il Filocolo (1338). Boccaccio became a friend of fellow Florentine Niccolò Acciaioli, and benefited from his influence as the administrator, and perhaps the lover, of Catherine of Valois-Courtenay, widow of Philip I of Taranto. Acciaioli later became counselor to Queen Joanna I of Naples and, eventually, her Grand Seneschal.

It seems that Boccaccio enjoyed law no more than banking, but his studies allowed him the opportunity to study widely and make good contacts with fellow scholars. His early influences included Paolo da Perugia (a curator and author of a collection of myths called the Collectiones), humanists Barbato da Sulmona and Giovanni Barrili, and theologian Dionigi di Borgo San Sepolcro.

Adult years

In Naples, Boccaccio began what he considered his true vocation of poetry. Works produced in this period include Il Filostrato and Teseida (the sources for Chaucer's Troilus and Criseyde and The Knight's Tale, respectively), The Filocolo (a prose version of an existing French romance), and La caccia di Diana (a poem in terza rima listing Neapolitan women). The period featured considerable formal innovation, including possibly the introduction of the Sicilian octave, where it influenced Petrarch.

Boccaccio returned to Florence in early 1341, avoiding the plague of 1340 in that city, but also missing the visit of Petrarch to Naples in 1341. He had left Naples due to tensions between the Angevin king and Florence. His father had returned to Florence in 1338, where he had gone bankrupt. His mother died shortly afterward (possibly, as she was unknown – see above). Boccaccio continued to work, although dissatisfied with his return to Florence, producing Comedia delle ninfe fiorentine in 1341 (also known as Ameto), a mix of prose and poems, completing the fifty-canto allegorical poem Amorosa visione in 1342, and Fiammetta in 1343. The pastoral piece "Ninfale fiesolano" probably dates from this time, also. In 1343, Boccaccio's father remarried to Bice del Bostichi. His other children by his first marriage had all died, but he had another son named Iacopo in 1344.

In Florence, the overthrow of Walter of Brienne brought about the government of popolo minuto ("small people", workers). It diminished the influence of the nobility and the wealthier merchant classes and assisted in the relative decline of Florence. The city was hurt further in 1348 by the Black Death, which killed some three-quarters of the city's population, later represented in the Decameron.

From 1347, Boccaccio spent much time in Ravenna, seeking new patronage and, despite his claims, it is not certain whether he was present in plague-ravaged Florence. His stepmother died during the epidemic and his father was closely associated with the government efforts as minister of supply in the city. His father died in 1349 and Boccaccio was forced into a more active role as head of the family.

Boccaccio began work on The Decameron around 1349. It is probable that the structures of many of the tales date from earlier in his career, but the choice of a hundred tales and the frame-story lieta brigata of three men and seven women dates from this time. The work was largely complete by 1352. It was Boccaccio's final effort in literature and one of his last works in Tuscan vernacular; the only other substantial work was Corbaccio (dated to either 1355 or 1365). Boccaccio revised and rewrote The Decameron in 1370–1371. This manuscript has survived to the present day.

From 1350, Boccaccio became closely involved with Italian humanism (although less of a scholar) and also with the Florentine government. His first official mission was to Romagna in late 1350. He revisited that city-state twice and also was sent to Brandenburg, Milan and Avignon. He also pushed for the study of Greek, housing Barlaam of Calabria, and encouraging his tentative translations of works by Homer, Euripides, and Aristotle. In these years, he also took minor orders.

In October 1350, he was delegated to greet Francesco Petrarch as he entered Florence and also to have Petrarch as a guest at Boccaccio's home, during his stay. The meeting between the two was extremely fruitful and they were friends from then on, Boccaccio calling Petrarch his teacher and magister. Petrarch at that time encouraged Boccaccio to study classical Greek and Latin literature. They met again in Padua in 1351, Boccaccio on an official mission to invite Petrarch to take a chair at the university in Florence. Although unsuccessful, the discussions between the two were instrumental in Boccaccio writing the Genealogia deorum gentilium; the first edition was completed in 1360 and this remained one of the key reference works on classical mythology for over 400 years. It served as an extended defense for the studies of ancient literature and thought. Despite the Pagan beliefs at its core, Boccaccio believed that much could be learned from antiquity. Thus, he challenged the arguments of clerical intellectuals who wanted to limit access to classical sources to prevent any moral harm to Christian readers. The revival of classical antiquity became a foundation of the Renaissance, and his defense of the importance of ancient literature was an essential requirement for its development. The discussions also formalized Boccaccio's poetic ideas. Certain sources also see a conversion of Boccaccio by Petrarch from the open humanist of the Decameron to a more ascetic style, closer to the dominant fourteenth century ethos. For example, he followed Petrarch (and Dante) in the unsuccessful championing of an archaic and deeply allusive form of Latin poetry. In 1359, following a meeting with Pope Innocent VI and further meetings with Petrarch, it is probable that Boccaccio took some kind of religious mantle. There is a persistent (but unsupported) tale that he repudiated his earlier works as profane in 1362, including The Decameron.

In 1360, Boccaccio began work on De mulieribus claris, a book offering biographies of 106 famous women, that he completed in 1374.

A number of Boccaccio's close friends and other acquaintances were executed or exiled in the purge following the failed coup of 1361. It was in this year that Boccaccio left Florence to reside in Certaldo, although not directly linked to the conspiracy, where he became less involved in government affairs. He did not undertake further missions for Florence until 1365, and traveled to Naples and then on to Padua and Venice, where he met up with Petrarch in grand style at Palazzo Molina, Petrarch's residence as well as the place of Petrarch's library. He later returned to Certaldo. He met Petrarch only once again in Padua in 1368. Upon hearing of the death of Petrarch (19 July 1374), Boccaccio wrote a commemorative poem, including it in his collection of lyric poems, the Rime.

He returned to work for the Florentine government in 1365, undertaking a mission to Pope Urban V. The papacy returned to Rome from Avignon in 1367, and Boccaccio was again sent to Urban, offering congratulations. He also undertook diplomatic missions to Venice and Naples.

Of his later works, the moralistic biographies gathered as De casibus virorum illustrium (1355–74) and De mulieribus claris (1361–1375) were most significant. Other works include a dictionary of geographical allusions in classical literature, De montibus, silvis, fontibus, lacubus, fluminibus, stagnis seu paludibus, et de nominibus maris liber. He gave a series of lectures on Dante at the Santo Stefano church in 1373 and these resulted in his final major work, the detailed Esposizioni sopra la Commedia di Dante. Boccaccio and Petrarch were also two of the most educated people in early Renaissance in the field of archaeology.

Boccaccio's change in writing style in the 1350s was due in part to meeting with Petrarch, but it was mostly due to poor health and a premature weakening of his physical strength. It also was due to disappointments in love. Some such disappointment could explain why Boccaccio came suddenly to write in a bitter Corbaccio style, having previously written mostly in praise of women and love, though elements of misogyny are present in Il Teseida. Petrarch describes how Pietro Petrone (a Carthusian monk) on his death bed in 1362 sent another Carthusian (Gioacchino Ciani) to urge him to renounce his worldly studies. Petrarch then dissuaded Boccaccio from burning his own works and selling off his personal library, letters, books, and manuscripts. Petrarch even offered to purchase Boccaccio's library, so that it would become part of Petrarch's library. However, upon Boccaccio's death, his entire collection was given to the monastery of Santo Spirito, in Florence, where it still resides.

His final years were troubled by illnesses, some relating to obesity and what often is described as dropsy, severe edema that would be described today as congestive heart failure. He died on 21 December 1375 in Certaldo, where he is buried.

Works

Alphabetical listing of selected works

Amorosa visione (1342)
Buccolicum carmen (1367–1369)
Caccia di Diana (1334–1337)
Comedia delle ninfe fiorentine (Ninfale d'Ameto, 1341–1342)
Corbaccio (around 1365, this date is disputed)
De Canaria (within 1341–1345)
De Casibus Virorum Illustrium. Facsimile of 1620 Paris ed., 1962, Scholars' Facsimiles & Reprints, .
De mulieribus claris (1361, revised up to 1375)
The Decameron (1349–52, revised 1370–1371)
Elegia di Madonna Fiammetta (1343–1344)
Esposizioni sopra la Comedia di Dante (1373–1374)
Filocolo (1336–1339)
Filostrato (1335 or 1340)
Genealogia deorum gentilium libri (1360, revised up to 1374)
Ninfale fiesolano (within 1344–46, this date is disputed)
Rime (finished 1374)
Teseida delle nozze di Emilia (before 1341)
Trattatello in laude di Dante (1357, title revised to De origine vita studiis et moribus viri clarissimi Dantis Aligerii florentini poetae illustris et de operibus compositis ab eodem)
Zibaldone Magliabechiano (within 1351–1356)

See Consoli's bibliography for an exhaustive listing.

See also

 Influence of Italian humanism on Chaucer

Notes

Citations

Sources 
 
 
 
 
 Çoban, R. V. (2020). The Manzikert Battle and Sultan Alp Arslan with European Perspective in the 15st Century in the Miniatures of Giovanni Boccaccio's "De Casibus Virorum Illustrium"s 226 and 232. French Manuscripts in Bibliothèque Nationale de France. S. Karakaya ve V. Baydar (Ed.), in 2nd International Muş Symposium Articles Book (pp. 48–64). Muş: Muş Alparslan University. Source 
 Patrick, James A.(2007). Renaissance And Reformation. Marshall Cavendish Corp. .

Further reading 
 On Famous Women, edited and translated by Virginia Brown. Cambridge, MA: Harvard University Press, 2001  (Latin text and English translation)
 The Decameron, 
 The Life of Dante, translated by Vincenzo Zin Bollettino. New York: Garland, 1990 
 The Elegy of Lady Fiammetta, edited and translated [from the Italian] by Mariangela Causa-Steindler and Thomas Mauch; with an introduction by Mariangela Causa-Steindler. Chicago: University of Chicago Press, 1990 .

External links

 
 
 
 
 
 
 De claris mulieribus From the Rare Book and Special Collections Division at the Library of Congress
 Genealogie deorum gentilium Johannis Boccacii de Certaldo liber at Somni
 De mulieribus claris at Somni

 
1313 births
1375 deaths
People from Certaldo
Italian Renaissance humanists
Italian Renaissance writers
Italian male poets
Italian Roman Catholics
Medieval Italian diplomats
Medieval Latin poets
14th-century people of the Republic of Florence
14th-century Italian historians
14th-century Italian poets
14th-century Latin writers
14th-century diplomats
Deaths from edema